Andrzej Abrek (died 1700) was a Polish philosopher. A rector and professor, he was the author of several Latin panegyrics.

References

1700 deaths
17th-century philosophers
17th-century Latin-language writers
Year of birth unknown
17th-century Polish philosophers